Pablo Arturo Quandt Cordoba (born May 14, 1985) is a Colombian footballer.

External links
 

1985 births
Living people
Colombian footballers
Unión Magdalena footballers
Patriotas Boyacá footballers
C.D. FAS footballers
Colombian expatriate footballers
Expatriate footballers in El Salvador
Expatriate footballers in Aruba
Association football forwards
Colombian expatriate sportspeople in El Salvador
People from Santa Marta
Sportspeople from Magdalena Department